On the Christmas Island, Australia is a branch of Westpac.

References

Economy of Christmas Island
Christmas Island-related lists
Christmas Island